Mohamed Sebaie (born March 28, 1988) is an Egyptian professional footballer who plays as a left back for the Egyptian club Al Nasr.

References

1988 births
Living people
Al Nasr SC (Egypt) players
Egyptian footballers
Association football defenders
Egyptian Premier League players